Cliver Antonio Alcalá Cordones (born 21 November 1961), is a retired Venezuelan major general and a member of the Bolivarian Army. Clíver Alcalá was one of the soldiers who participated in the attempted coup d'état against President Carlos Andrés Pérez in February 1992, and served as chief of garrison in the cities of both Valencia and Maracay, and finally as general commander of the Integral Defense Region in Guayana (REDI-Guayana). Alcalá Cordones was discharged from the Army on 5 July 2013 during the presidency of Nicolás Maduro.

In 2011, Alcalá was accused by the United States government of being a drug trafficker and a member of the Cartel of the Suns. Alcalá moved from Venezuela to Barranquilla, Colombia in 2018 and emerged as a forceful opponent of Maduro, described as the "ringleader" of the Venezuelan military deserters. 

In March 2020, Alcalá turned himself in to US authorities in Barranquilla, Colombia after the US Department of State and the Drug Enforcement Administration offered a US$10 million reward for his capture.

Military career 
Alcalá Cordones is an officer graduated from the Bolivarian Military University of Venezuela. Cordones collaborated with Hugo Chávez during the attempted coup in February 1992 and in 2002, months after the attempted coup against Chávez, he led the intervention of the Caracas Metropolitan Police, then under the command of Mayor Alfredo Peña.

In 2008, Cordones served as head of the Valencia garrison, in the Carabobo state, later he led the Maracay garrison, in Aragua state, and in 2013 he served as general commander of the Guayana Comprehensive Defense Region (REDI-Guayana).

Caracol Radio reported that investigators and their collaborators that at one point in time; Alcalá had more power than Diosdado Cabello and Nicolás Maduro. This was the result of the conjunction of his narco trafficking segment with the Guajira cartel. A conjunction that was sealed by the marriage between Alcala and Marta González, a niece of Hermágoras González, leader of the La Guajira cartel. Maduro and Diosdado eradicated Alcala as he was becoming a threat to their power and dominance of the cartel as a whole.

Investigations 
In September 2011, four Hugo Chávez allies (including Alcalá Cordones) were sanctioned by the United States Department of the Treasury for allegedly helping FARC obtain weapons and smuggle drugs. It accuses him of using his position to establish an arms-for-drugs route with the FARC.

On 18 April 2012, Alcalá Cordones was singled out for being involved in drug trafficking in Venezuela by former magistrate , exiled in Panama, who confessed to having been pressured by Hugo Chávez to condemn Iván Simonovis and having had a friendly relationship with Walid Makled.

In 2018, the confessed drug trafficker Walid Makled published a video on social networks from an alleged SEBIN prison where he threatened Cliver Alcalá, "I told you that I am going to be your shadow, I am going for you." Cliver Alcalá collaborated with the investigation and arrest of Walid Makled.

According to the Associated Press, since 2019 Cliver Alcalá dedicated himself to coordinating a military plan to overthrow Maduro with the help of American advisers and the support of Silvercorp USA company. Lester Toledo, member of Popular Will, introduced the US military Jordan Goudreau to Alcalá. A group of 300 Venezuelan soldiers was training in the Colombian border. The plans were frustrated after the Colombian police seized an arsenal of weapons of war and then the extradition of Alcalá was requested by the Venezuelan government and by the United States government.

Exile and extradition to the US 

Cliver Alcalá began to reside in Barranquilla, Colombia from 2018 until his decision to surrender to US authorities in March 2020.

On 26 March 2020, Alcalá assumed responsibility for "a military operation against the Maduro dictatorship", including a shipment of weapons captured in Colombia, stating that the United States, Colombia and Juan Guaidó officials had signed an agreement to support their efforts to overthrow President Maduro. Guaidó denied knowledge of the event while United States Special Representative to Venezuela Elliott Abrams described Alcalá's statement as "despicable and quite dangerous".

Alcalá is reported to have played a role in planning the unsuccessful Macuto Bay raid, which took place after Alcalá was extradited to the United States.

Arrest 
On 27 March 2020, Clíver Alcalá turned himself in before the Colombian National Intelligence Directorate, after the United States Department of Justice included him in a list of solicitors the previous day, offering ten million dollars for his capture and by that of four other senior Venezuelan officials wanted for drug trafficking, including ongoing president Nicolás Maduro.  Clíver subsequently turned himself in to the Drug Enforcement Administration (DEA) after agreeing to collaborate with prosecutors, being extradited to the United States. 

In November 2021, Alcalá's lawyers lodged a motion to have the charges dismissed along with a statement that US officials at the highest levels of the CIA, Treasury Justice, the National Security Council and the Drug Enforcement Administration were aware of his efforts to overthrow Maduro. The statement said J. J. Rendón and two allies of Juan Guaidó were also aware of Alcalá's coup plan.

Family and personal life 
Cliver Alcalá Cordones was married on 13 May 2012 to Marta González.

References 

1961 births
Living people
Venezuelan emigrants to Colombia
Fugitives wanted by the United States
Venezuelan soldiers
Venezuelan military personnel
Venezuelan defectors
People extradited to the United States
People extradited from Colombia
People of the Crisis in Venezuela
People of the 1992 Venezuelan coup d'état attempts